Presidential elections were held in El Salvador between 13 and 15 January 1935. Maximiliano Hernández Martínez was the only candidate and was returned unopposed.

Results

References

Bibliography
Alvarenga Venutolo, Patricia (1996) Cultura y etica de la violencia San José: EDUCA
Anderson, Thomas P (1971) Matanza: El Salvador's communist revolt of 1932 Lincoln: University of Nebraska Press
Bland, Gary "Assessing the transition to democracy." in Tulchin, Joseph S. with Gary Bland (1992) Is there a transition to democracy in El Salvador? Boulder: Westview Press
Grieb, Kenneth J (1971) "The United States and the rise of General Maximiliano Hernández Martínez." Journal of Latin American studies 3, 2:151-172
Krehm, William (1957) Democracia y tiranias en el Caribe Buenos Aires: Editorial Parnaso
Larde y Larín, Jorge (1958) Guía Histórica de El Salvador San Salvador: Ministerio de Culture
Lungo Uclés, Mario (1996) El Salvador in the eighties: counterinsurgency and revolution Philadelphia: Temple University Press
Political Handbook of the world 1935 New York, 1936
Vidal, Manuel (1970) Nociones de historia de Centro América San Salvador: Ministerio de Educación. Ninth edition

El Salvador
Presidential elections in El Salvador
1935 in El Salvador
Single-candidate elections
Election and referendum articles with incomplete results